Leptospermum myrsinoides, commonly known as the heath tea-tree or silky tea-tree, is a species of shrub that is endemic to south-eastern continental Australia. It has smooth bark on the younger stems, narrow egg-shaped leaves with the narrower end towards the base, white flowers and fruit that has the remains of the sepals attached but usually falls from the plant soon after the seeds are released.

Description
The older stems have stems with thin, firm bark and younger stems smooth bark that is hairy at first and later shed in stringy strips. There are broad reddish brown bracts at the base of the flower bud but which usually fall off as the flower opens.

Taxonomy and naming
Leptospermum myrsinoides was first formally described in 1847 by German botanist Diederich von Schlechtendal in the journal Linnaea: ein Journal für die Botanik in ihrem ganzen Umfange, oder Beiträge zur Pflanzenkunde.

Distribution and habitat
The heath tea-tree grows in heath and mallee from Eden on the far south coast of New South Wales to the Mount Lofty Ranges and Kangaroo Island and is widespread in Victoria.

References

myrsinoides
Myrtales of Australia
Flora of South Australia
Flora of New South Wales
Flora of Victoria (Australia)
Plants described in 1847